Rear Admiral Claes Egmont Tornberg (born 10 February 1936) is a retired Swedish Navy officer. He served as chief of the Coastal Fleet from 1985 and 1990 and as head of the Swedish Armed Forces Staff College from 1990 to 1996 and the newly created Swedish National Defence College from 1997 to 1998.

Early life
Tornberg was born on 10 February 1936 in Västerås Parish, Sweden, the son of colonel Egmont Tornberg and his wife Aina (née Setterborg). He passed studentexamen at Södra Latin in Stockholm on 7 May 1955.

Career
Tornberg graduated from the Royal Swedish Naval Academy in September 1958. He underwent a staff course at the Swedish Armed Forces Staff College between 1966 and 1968, and attended the Naval War College in the United States from 1976 to 1977. Tornberg commanded the 11th Torpedo Boat Division (11. torpedbåtsdivisionen) from 1977 to 1979 and was head of the Naval Staff's Planning Section from 1979 to 1983.

He was promoted to captain on 25 June 1981. On 1 October 1983, Tornberg was appointed flag captain in the Coastal Fleet. He was promoted to rear admiral and appointed chief of the Coastal Fleet from 1 October 1985. Tornberg then served as head of the Swedish Armed Forces Staff College from 1990. The Swedish Armed Forces Staff College was amalgamated with the Swedish National Defence College on 1 January 1997 of which Tornberg became its head. He retired on 31 March 1998.

Personal life
She was the daughter of county council director Erland von Hofsten and his wife Ebba Sörensen. The wedding officiant was court chaplain . Their daughter was born on 23 September 1962 at Allmänna BB in Stockholm and a second daughter was born on 31 December 1963 at Allmänna BB. He also has two sons.

Dates of rank
1958 – Acting sub-lieutenant
1960 – Sub-lieutenant
1966 – Lieutenant
1971 – Lieutenant commander
1972 – Commander
1979 – ''
25 June 1981 – Captain
1 October 1985 – Rear admiral

Awards and decorations
   H. M. The King's Medal, 12th size gold (silver-gilt) medal worn around the neck on a blue ribbon (2007)

Honours
Member of the Royal Swedish Society of Naval Sciences (1977)
Member of the Royal Swedish Academy of War Sciences (1983)
President of the Royal Swedish Society of Naval Sciences (1991)

References

1936 births
Living people
Swedish Navy rear admirals
People from Västerås
Members of the Royal Swedish Society of Naval Sciences
Members of the Royal Swedish Academy of War Sciences